The 1986–87 Austrian Hockey League season was the 57th season of the Austrian Hockey League, the top level of ice hockey in Austria. Seven teams participated in the league, and EC KAC won the championship.

First round

Final round

Playoffs

Semifinals
EV Innsbruck - Wiener EV 1:3 (6:3, 3:4 OT, 2:4, 1:3)
EC KAC - VEU Feldkirch 3:0 (6:3, 5:1, 5:2)

3rd place
EV Innsbruck defeated VEU Feldkirch

Final
EC KAC - Wiener EV 3:0 (6:3, 5:4 SO, 5:4)

External links
Austrian Ice Hockey Association

1986–87
Aus
League